Randal "Randy" Hendricks (born November 18, 1945 in Kansas City, Missouri) is an American attorney and sports agent[1]. He was raised in Westwood, Kansas and is a 1963 graduate of Shawnee Mission North High School, where he was a finalist in the National Merit Scholarship Program. He is managing partner of Hendricks Sports Management, L.P., and managing member of Hendricks Interests LLC, both in Houston, Texas.

Education
 Bachelor of Science degree in pre law/finance, with honors, University of Houston, 1968
 Doctor of Jurisprudence, with honors, University of Houston Law Center, 1970
 Chancellor, Order of the Barons, University of Houston Law Center, 1969, Articles Editor, Houston Law Review, 1969-70.

Career
He practiced law with the Houston firm of Baker Botts out of law school. While there, he represented his first professional athlete. In 1972, he joined with his brother, Alan, to form Hendricks Sports Management. Hendricks was involved in the movement for free agency, a change for professional athletes from the reserve system. Hendricks concentrated on this area until the players earned their free agency in the late 1970s. He continuously represented a significant number of professional athletes for over 40 years.

The Hendricks brothers formed Hendricks Sports Management and built an agency which represented approximately 10% of all major league baseball players for nearly 20 years. In 1999, the Hendricks sold their company to SFX Entertainment [2], (now Live Nation), where Randy became Chairman and CEO of the baseball group. Following the conclusion of their management contracts in 2004, the brothers reformed Hendricks Sports Management, which reestablished their profile as leaders in their industry [3]. In 2013 Hendricks transitioned from the representation of active players to advising a number of retired players.

Hendricks is the author of Inside the Strike Zone, published in 1994 and nominated for the Casey Award for best baseball book for that year. Hendricks has negotiated many record contracts, including several for Roger Clemens [4] and his $28 million one-year contract for Roger Clemens was the highest in the history of baseball.  He negotiated a record $37.25 million contract for 21 year old Cuban defector Aroldis Chapman.

Less well known has been Hendricks' career for over 40 years in managing a real estate portfolio of raw land and residential developments in the greater Houston area[5]. In May 2014 he sold a significant tract of land for the expansion of The Woodlands, Texas[6][7], the most successful "new town" master-planned community in the United States.  That land is now known as The Woodlands Hills development.

Recognition
Hendricks has been named the top agent by Baseball America [8], and among the 100 most powerful people in sports by The Sporting News [9].  Forbes Magazine recognized him as one of the most effective agents for his clients [10].  He has  frequently been recognized as one of the best in his profession for over 30 years [11].

Hendricks has been recognized for both his preparation and advocacy in arbitration and collusion cases, and holds one of the best lifetime records in those cases [12].

Hendricks was appointed as a member of the Houston/Harris County Public Sports Advisory Committee in 1995 by Houston Mayor Bob Lanier.  Hendricks wrote the election day editorial for the Houston Chronicle in favor of the referendum for new sports stadia in Houston and Harris County, Texas[13].  The measure passed in a close vote, and led to the construction of new sports facilities for professional teams, including Minute Maid Park for the Houston Astros, NRG Stadium for the Houston Texans and Toyota Center for the Houston Rockets.

See also
Sports agent: for listing of prominent sports agents, by field.

References
1. Handrinos, Peter, "Baseball Men: The Agent", Yahoo Sports! Scout.com, September 21, 2005. Schwarz, Alan, "Double Agents", Baseball America, March 4, 1996. Pate, Steve, "Double Agents", Dallas Morning News, July 1, 1987, reprinted with permission in the Texas Bar Journal, November, 1987. 
2. Carroll, Chris, "Houston baseball agents talk deal for SFX Entertainment acquisition," Houston Business Journal, May 16, 1999.
3. Mullen, Liz, "Hendricks brothers rocket back to top", Sports Business Journal, June 25, 2007.
4. Associated Press, "Clemens becomes highest paid pitcher in baseball history", Houston Business Journal, January 21, 2005.
5. Wollam, Allison, "Baseball agents take a swing at new communities", Houston Business Journal, April 18, 2005. Hooper, Carl, "Cypress Forest to be built", Houston Post, March 23, 1986.
6. Guillen, Darla, "2014's Biggest Residential Real Estate Stories", Houston Chronicle, December 26, 2014.
7. Bivins, Ralph, "The Woodlands, Part 2: Woodlands Developer Buying 2,000 acres for community 13 miles north of the Woodlands", Realty News Reports, August 8, 2014.
8. Lingo, Will, "Top Power Brokers", Baseball America, January 20, 1996.
9. "The 100 Most Powerful in Sports", The Sporting News, January 1, 2003.  "The 100 Most Powerful in Sports", The Sporting News, January 1, 1996.  "Power Brokers", Baseball America, January 23, 1995.  "Power Brokers", Baseball America, January 11, 1993.  "25 Most Influential People in Baseball in the 90's", The National, February 19, 1991.  Okrent, Daniel, "The Pitchers Right Arm", Texas Monthly, May, 1981.
10. Schwartz, Peter, "Baseball's Best Agents", Forbes, June 20, 2007.
11. Sperry, Paul, "Baseball's Hendricks Brothers", Investor's Business Daily, September 22, 1992. Duffey, Gene, "Dynamic Duo Raise the Stakes", Houston Post, June 23, 1991.  Antonen, Mel, "Let's Make a Deal", USA Today, December 20, 1989. Fischer, Anne B., "Five Stellar Advisors", Fortune, Fall, 1989.  Hand, Kenny, "Hendrickses: Dynamic Player Agents", Houston Post, March 18, 1980. Manuel, John, "Draft Winners & Losers", Baseball America, August 17, 2010.
12, Perkins, Dave, "Hendricks brothers are a real big hit when money is on the line", Toronto Star, February 19, 1991.  Newhan, Ross, "These Guys Really Know How to Win", Los Angeles Times, February 24, 1991.  Handrinos, Peter, "Baseball Men: The Agent", Yahoo Sports! Scout.com, September 21, 2005.
13. Hendricks, Randal, "Play Ball", Houston Chronicle editorial page, November 5, 1996. 
Custred, Jayne, "Hendricks a major league name", Houston Chronicle, July 27, 1989.
Rendon, Ruth, "Not-so-secret agents", Houston Chronicle, May 8, 1988.
Hand, Kenny, "Cooler Heads Saved Season", Houston Post, August 11, 1985.
White, George, "Agents and Owners", Houston Chronicle, December 9, 1984.
Hand, Kenny, "Contract Diplomats", Houston Post, January 22, 1984.

University of Houston alumni
University of Houston Law Center alumni
American sports agents
Living people
1945 births
Texas lawyers
People associated with Baker Botts